In 2001–2002 several Republican state representatives in Wisconsin objected to the hiring of Jamyi Witch, a Wiccan, as a prison chaplain. 
The objection to the hiring was led by Michael Huebsch and later joined by Scott Walker who was then a state representative.

Genesis of issue
In December 2001, Mike Huebsch began leading efforts to block the funding for Witch's $32,500-a-year position. He stated taxpayers "shouldn't be forced to accept this hocus-pocus." The legislators had learned that Wisconsin Department of Corrections had recently hired Rev. Jamyi Witch as a prison chaplain at the Waupun Correctional Institution in Waupun, Wisconsin. Witch, who had volunteered for two years as a chaplain and had an extensive knowledge of alternative religions, had competed against nine other candidates for the civil service position and was hired as the most qualified candidate for the $32,500 per year job.

The chaplain was a practicing Wiccan and had, in fact, changed her last name to Witch in honor of her chosen religion.

Hiring controversy
Huebsch and Walker objected publicly on the basis of her religion to the chaplain’s hiring, saying: "Witch's hiring raises both personal and political concerns. Not only does she practice a different religion than most of the inmates – she practices a religion that actually offends people of many other faiths, including Christians, Muslims and Jews."

Huebsch and Walker threatened to launch a government investigation of the chaplain’s hiring,  "Taxpayers shouldn't be forced to accept this hocus-pocus," Huebsch stated. Huebsch proposed to delete the state appropriation which funded Witch's position, even though in the past he had repeatedly advocated increasing state funding for prison chaplains.

After several weeks of unwanted publicity, the chaplain began to receive calls and messages including a handful of death threats and reported that on one day alone she had received 432 emails and 76 phone messages at her home. She said the majority of the messages were strongly supportive.

Conclusion
Walker and Huebsch, who had said they would draft legislation to prevent similar hirings by the state of Wisconsin, were ultimately unsuccessful in their efforts to terminate the employment of Witch, who was represented by the Wisconsin State Employees Union, founding body of the American Federation of State, County and Municipal Employees.
Witch and the prison's only Muslim chaplain were subsequently excluded from the longstanding Waupun Clergy Association, which declared that it was open only to Christians.

2011 hostage incident 

In 2011, Witch was taken hostage by an inmate who barricaded himself in her office.  The inmate alleged that Witch masterminded the hostage crisis in order to get a transfer to another prison. He claimed that Witch met with him on a prior occasion to plan this hostage situation, though at the time the accuser claims the conspiracy took place, Witch was able to show she was not present due to medical leave. The State charged Witch with multiple criminal offenses, including sexual assault as the inmate claimed that she complied with performing a forced sexual act during the hostage situation. Prosecutors dropped the charges in August 2013 due to inconsistencies in the accuser's claims.  Witch stated that the charges should have never been filed, and that she plans to file suit against the department of corrections and other involved agencies.

References 

Political history of Wisconsin
Wicca in the United States
2001 in Wisconsin
2002 in Wisconsin
2000s in modern paganism
Religious discrimination in the United States
Penal system in the United States